Usha Kiran Palace is a heritage hotel, adjacent to Jai Vilas Mahal on a 9-acre land in Gwalior built by the royal Scindia dynasty of the Marathas. The management of the five-star hotel is done by Taj Hotels Resorts and Palaces. The hotel makes use of solar power energy  produced at Kadodiya Solar Park, which has been built by Vivaan Solar.

History
It was built in 1902 as a guest residence for the Prince of Wales who was visiting. It later became the guest house of Jivajirao Scindia where he brought Vijayaraje Scindia after the marriage.

Subsequently moving from Mumbai to Gwalior, Priyadarshini Raje Scindia, the wife of Jyotiraditya Scindia, transformed the Palace into a hotel. The Palace has preserved its tradition with the usage of rosewood elevator from 1930 and two-blade ceiling fans.

See also 
 Jai Vilas Mahal

External links
 Official Website

References

Buildings and structures in Gwalior
Palaces in Madhya Pradesh
Royal residences in India
Heritage hotels in India
Taj Hotels Resorts and Palaces
Tourist attractions in Gwalior
Hotels in Madhya Pradesh